David Michael Baden-Powell, 4th Baron Baden-Powell (born 11 December 1940, Sinoia, Rhodesia), is a former insurance sales agent and financial planner.

He is the second son of Peter Baden-Powell, 2nd Baron Baden-Powell, and Carine Boardman. He is the brother of Robert Baden-Powell, 3rd Baron Baden-Powell. He is the grandson of Robert Baden-Powell, 1st Baron Baden-Powell, and Olave Baden-Powell, and great-grandson of Baden Powell. The peerage descended to him upon the death of his childless brother Robert on 28 December 2019.

Family life and work
He was born in Sinoia, Southern Rhodesia (now Zimbabwe), the second son of Peter Baden-Powell, later 2nd Baron Baden-Powell, and Carine Boardman. After his father inherited the peerage, the family moved from Rhodesia to Britain in 1949. He was educated at Pierrepont School, Frensham, England. He worked for Fairey Aviation as a draftsman until April 1965 when he migrated to Australia where he became an insurance sales agent. He married Joan Phillips Berryman, daughter of Horace William Berryman on 20 August 1966.

Michael Baden-Powell has three sons and lives in Melbourne, Australia.

Scouting and freemasonry

He has been:
 B-P Fellow
 World Scout Foundation member
 Baden-Powell Foundation of Australia member
 Victorian Scout Foundation member
 Scout Heritage of Victoria, patron
 Australian Badge Club, patron
 Australia Day Council Victorian Branch, member
 Freemason and past Master of Baden-Powell Lodge No. 488 in Melbourne, Victoria, a Masonic Lodge founded by Scouters, chartered in 1930, the first named after his grandfather, who donated the Volume of Sacred Law in 1931, and which has close links to Scouting.
 Freemason of Lodge of Unity Peace and Concord (UK), two Masonic Lodges in the USA and honorary member of Lodge Amalthea (Melbourne)

In 1929, a Rolls-Royce car and an Eccles brand caravan were presented to his grandparents during the 3rd World Scout Jamboree. The car was sold after his grandfather died in 1941. He was instrumental in preserving the caravan, and, with John Ineson, Tony Harvey and Stephen Hilditch, he established a charitable company, "B-P Jam Roll Ltd. which obtained a loan and purchased the car, nicknamed "Jam Roll" (from Jamboree and Rolls-Royce)  and funds were raised to repay the loan. The car and caravan had been re-united in 2007, during 21st World Scout Jamboree after the car and its owner had been found by The Scout Association's archivist, Paul Moniyhan, who made a proposal to purchase it.

He was awarded:
 The Scout Association of Australia's 50 plus year service award, Silver Koala and Kangaroo.
 Scout Association of Malaysia's order of the Green Forest
 Scout Association of Japan's Golden Pheasant and Medal of Merit
 Girl Guides Association of Malaysia's Medal of Merit.
 Guides Australia's Thanks Badge, 2007. 
 Boy Scouts of America's Daniel Carter Beard Masonic Scouter’s Award, 2007.

Arms

References

1940 births
Barons Baden-Powell
People from Chinhoyi
Living people
People educated at Pierrepont School, Frensham
Scouting and Guiding in Australia
Scouting and Guiding in the United Kingdom
Michael
Australian Freemasons
English emigrants to Australia